Bernstein is a common surname in the German language, meaning "amber" (literally "burn stone"). The name is used by both Germans and Jews, although it is most common among people of Ashkenazi Jewish heritage.

Notable people sharing the surname "Bernstein"

A–H
 Aaron Bernstein (1812–1884), German short story writer and historian
 Abe Bernstein (1892–1968), American mobster
 Abraham Bernstein (disambiguation), several people
 Adam Bernstein (born 1960), American film, music video, television director, and screenwriter
 Al Bernstein (born 1950), American sportscaster, writer, stage performer, recording artist, and speaker
 Al Bernstein (born 1949), Austrian contemporary artist
 Al Bernstein (born 1950), American boxing commentator
 Alan Bernstein (born 1947), Canadian medical researcher
 Alexander Bernstein, Baron Bernstein of Craigweil (1936–2010), British television executive and politician and psychologist, doctor of medicine, professor
 Alfred Bernstein (1911–2003), American civil rights and union activist
 Andrew Bernstein (born 1949), American Objectivist philosopher
 Armyan Bernstein,  American film producer, director and screenwriter
 Arnold Bernstein (1888–1971), German-American shipowner and pioneer of transatlantic car transport
 Artie Bernstein (1909–1964), American jazz bassist 
 Aryeh Leib Bernstein (1708–1788), Chief Rabbi of Galicia 
 Assaf Bernstein (born 1970), Israeli director and screenwriter.
 Basil Bernstein (1924–2000), British sociologist and linguist
 Benjamin Abram Bernstein (1881–1964), American mathematician
 Bernard Bernstein (1908–1990), American economist and public official
 Bernard Bernstein (1899–1963), English table tennis player
 Byron Bernstein (1989–2020), known as Reckful, Israeli-American Twitch streamer and former professional Esports player
 Bonnie Bernstein (born 1970), American sports broadcaster
 Carl Bernstein (born 1944), American investigative journalist, Watergate reporter
 Charles Bernstein (poet) (born 1950), American poet, father of Felix Bernstein
 Charles Bernstein (composer) (born 1943), film and television music composer
 Daniel Bernstein, video game and movie composer, and CEO of Sandlot Games
 Daniel J. Bernstein (born 1971), American mathematics professor, creator of qmail and djbdns, and plaintiff in Bernstein v. United States
 David Bernstein (executive) (born 1943), English football and business executive
 David E. Bernstein (born 1967), American law professor, writer, libertarian
 David I. Bernstein, Rabbi at Pardes Institute of Jewish Studies, Jerusalem and New York City
 Eduard Bernstein (1850–1932), German Social Democrat
 Elmer Bernstein (1922–2004), American composer and conductor 
 Elsa Bernstein (1866–1949), Austrian-German writer and dramatist of Jewish descent
 Evan Bernstein (born 1960), Israeli Olympic wrestler
 Felix Bernstein (artist) (born 1992), American performance artist, son of Charles Bernstein
 Felix Bernstein (mathematician) (1878–1956), German mathematician
 F. W. Bernstein (1938–2018), German poet, cartoonist, satirist and academic
 Georg Heinrich Bernstein (1787–1860), German orientalist
 Harry Bernstein (1910–2011), British-born American author
 Heinrich Agathon Bernstein (1828–1865), German naturalist, zoologist and explorer 
 Henri Bernstein (also Henry-Léon-Gustave-Charles Bernstein, 1876–1953), French playwright
 Henry Bernstein (sociologist) (1912–1964), social realist artist, WPA muralist
 Herman Bernstein (1876–1935), Jewish American journalist and writer
 Hilda Bernstein (1915–2006), South African author, artist, activist against apartheid and for women's rights

I–N
 Ignatius Bernstein (1846–1900), Russian railroad engineer
 Ira B. Bernstein (born 1924), American physicist, specializing in theoretical plasma physics
 Isadore Bernstein (1876–1944), American screenwriter
 J. Sidney Bernstein (1877–1943), Russian-American lawyer, politician, and judge
 Jack Bernstein (1899–1945), American boxer
 Jake Bernstein, American Pulitzer Prize-winning investigative journalist and author
 Jake Bernstein (born 1946), American financial businesspeople
 Jared Bernstein (born 1955), American economist
 Jed Bernstein (born 1955), American executive in the performing arts
 Jeremy Bernstein (born 1929), Physicist on Project Orion (nuclear propulsion)

 Joseph Bernstein (born 1945), Israeli mathematician
 Joseph Milton Bernstein (1908–1975), alleged spy
 Josh Bernstein (born 1971), American explorer, author, and television personality
 Julius Bernstein (1839–1917), German neurobiologist
 Léna Bernstein (1906–1932), German aviator 
 Leonard Bernstein (1918–1990), American composer, conductor, pianist, author, and teacher
 Lionel Bernstein (1920–2002), South African anti-apartheid activist and political prisoner
 Ludwig B. Bernstein (1870–1944), Latvian-American sociologist and social worker
 Matt Bernstein (born 1982), American football player
 Max Bernstein (1854–1925), German art and theatre critic and author
 Melanie Bernstein (born 1976), German politician
 Michèle Bernstein (born 1932), French writer
 Mikhail Bernshtein (1875–1960), Soviet painter and art educator
 Miriam Bernstein-Cohen (1895–1991), Israeli actress, director, poet and translator
 Morris Louis Bernstein (1912–1962), American abstract expressionist painter
 Nikolai Bernstein (1896–1966), Russian neurophysiologist

O–Z
 Ossip Bernstein (1882–1962), Russian chess master
 Peretz Bernstein (1890–1971), Zionist activist and Israeli politician

 Phil Bernstein, American computer scientist 
 Rhett Bernstein (born 1987), American soccer player

Ronni Reis-Bernstein (born 1966), American tennis player
 Roxy Bernstein (born 1972), American sportscaster
 Salomon Bernstein (1886–1968), Israeli painter
 Samuil Bernstein (1911–1997), Soviet linguist
 Sergei Natanovich Bernstein (1880–1968), Soviet mathematician
 Sid Bernstein (editor) (1907–1993), Advertising Age co-founder, Crain publications chairman, Ad Age writer/editor
 Sid Bernstein (impresario) (1918–2013), brought the Beatles and the Rolling Stones to America, organized rock concerts
 Sidney Bernstein (disambiguation)
 Seymour Bernstein (born 1927), American pianist, composer, and teacher.

 Theodore Menline Bernstein (1904–1979), American journalist, New York Times editor
 Theresa Bernstein (1890–2002), American artist and painter
 Walter Bernstein (1919-2021), American film producer and screenwriter
 William J. Bernstein (born 1948), American financial theorist
 Zalman Bernstein (1926–1999), American billionaire businessman and philanthropist

From non-English Wikipedias 

  (1870–1922), Russian and Soviet psychiatrist, psychotherapist
  (born 1927), Romanian Jewish writer, journalist, literary critic and theater editor
  (1672–1699), German hymn writer
  (1868–?), French and Russian surgeon and medical scientist
  (1974–2017), German politician ( CDU )
  (1839–1905), the first Rosh Yeshiva of Yeshivat Chayei Olam in Jerusalem.
  (1924–2015), Estonian Soviet art historian, doctor of art history
  (1797–1838), German writer
  (born 1936), German screenwriter , director , audio book producer and radio writer
  (born 1973), Russian-Israeli painter and sculptor
  (born 1944), Israeli professor emeritus, sociologist and social historian
  (born 1989), American tennis player
  (1909–1993), educator, professor, editor and activist
  (1910–1990), Chilean diplomat 
  (1929–1999), German photographer
  (1899–1976), Soviet istorik- medievalist , translator from Old French and modern French language
  (born 1964), German ancient historian
  (1818–1886), German military and administrative officials
  (1790–1861), Grand Ducal Hessian General of the Infantry and Minister of War 
  (?–1670), Domdechant Magdeburg and canon to Naumburg 
  (born 1924), American Contemporary artist
  (born 1955), American screenwriter
  (born 1955), officer in the IDF in the reserves with the rank of brigadier general
  (1525–1589), Electoral Saxon Privy Council
  (1930–2001), German lawyer and university professor
  (1836–1909), Russian-Jewish folklorist and linguist
  (1919–1992),　Soviet and Russian literary critic 
  (1929–2012), Soviet and Russian translator
 Jacob Bernstein-Kohan (1859–1929), Russian doctor and Zionist 
  (1888–1943), Austrian actress
  (1757–1838), Hesse-Darmstadt Lieutenant General
  (1747–1835), German physician and professor of medicine
  (1842–1894), Russian lawyer, professor of law
  (1921–2019), commander of a partisan battalion
  (1862–1889), Russian revolutionary , narodolets
  (1867–1944 ), French sculptor
  (1873–1931), Romanian Jew poet,  playwright and editor
  (born 1970), Brazilian screenwriter and film director
  (1919–1989), leading materials scientists of the USSR
  (1886–1918), Russian revolutionary , political figure, Ph.D.
  (1911–1984), Soviet oil geologist, teacher
  (1911–2002), Soviet literary critic
  (1908–1943), Jewish teacher and communist 
  (1893–1983), Israeli writer , playwright , publisher and public figure
  (1862–1934), one of the founders of Rosh Pina
  (1892–1956), rabbi and Revisionist public activist
  (1861–1927), Russian revolutionary and political activist.
  (1836–1891), Russian doctor, physiologist
  (1922–1997), Moldovan Soviet translator and journalist 
  (1876–1938), Russian musicologist, music critic and historian
  (1891–1976), German engineer and cryptologist
  (1897–1944 or 1945), German political scientist , journalist and community college teacher
  (1870–1949), Soviet translator
  (born 1939), German historian and publicist
  (1869–1942), Jewish poet , novelist and playwright
  (1896–1977), German comintern and film official
  (born 1985), American jazz and improvisation musician
  (1901–1958), Russian civil engineer
  (1892–1970), Russian (Soviet) linguist , bibliographer , historian of the theater, one of the founders of OPOZAZ
  (1886–1951), Russian and Soviet economist, economic geographer
  (1884–1962), literary researcher, writer, editor and Zionist
  (1907–1969), Israeli architect
  (born 1957), German visual artist and art teacher
  (1900–1936), Russian-born Italian mathematician
  (1901–1981), German artist

Fictional people

 Rugal Bernstein, a major villain in the King of Fighters video game series
 Adelheid Bernstein, the son of Rugal, making a debut appearance in King of Fighters 2003
 Mr. Bernstein, the business partner of Charles Foster Kane in the 1941 film Citizen Kane
 Judith Bernstein, pseudonym of the character Janine Butcher in the British soap opera EastEnders
 Kudelia Aina Bernstein, a character in the mecha anime series Mobile Suit Gundam: Iron-Blooded Orphans

Places 
Château du Bernstein, a castle in Alsace, France
Bernstein im Burgenland, a village near the Austrian-Hungarian border
Pełczyce, a town in the Polish West Pomeranian Voivodeship (part of Germany until 1945), known in German as Bernstein
Bernstein (Northern Black Forest), a mountain in Baden-Württemberg, Germany

See also 
 
 Justice Bernstein (disambiguation)
 Berenstein, a variant
 Bernstine
 Albert Baernstein II (1941–2014), American mathematician
 Dan Bern (born 1965), American musician who previously performed under the name Bernstein
 Eric Berne (1910–1970, born Bernstein), American psychiatrist and writer
 Burstyn (disambiguation), a Polish and Ukrainian version of the same word

References

Ashkenazi surnames
German-language surnames
Yiddish-language surnames
Surnames from ornamental names